The Ladies Finnish Open is a professional women's golf tournament held in Finland. It was played as part of the Swedish Golf Tour 1998–2011, the LET Access Series 2012–2019, and after a one year hiatus, added to the Ladies European Tour in 2021.

Finland last hosted a Ladies European Tour event in the Ladies Finnish Masters (2005–2011). Aura Golf, founded in 1958 and one of the oldest golf courses in Finland, hosted a men's Gant Open on the 2015 Challenge Tour.

Winners

See also
Ladies Finnish Masters
Gant Open

References

External links

Ladies European Tour events
Ladies Finnish Open
Swedish Golf Tour (women) events
Golf tournaments in Finland